Dean Warren Couzins (born 9 June 1981 in Christchurch) is a field hockey player from New Zealand, who earned his first cap for the national team, nicknamed The Black Sticks, in 2001 against Malaysia. The defender played the latter part of 2005 for Dutch club Breda, returning to join the NZ team for the Oceania Cup in November. Dean joined Dutch club SV Kampong in 2006–2007 helping them to a successful first year in the Dutch first league.

International senior tournaments
 2001 – World Cup Qualifier
 2002 – World Cup
 2002 – Commonwealth Games
 2003 – Sultan Azlan Shah Cup
 2003 – Champions Challenge
 2004 – Olympic Qualifier
 2004 – Summer Olympics
 2004 – Champions Trophy
 2005 – Sultan Azlan Shah Cup
 2006 – Commonwealth Games
 2006 – World Cup
 2007 – Champions Challenge
 2008 – Olympic Games
 2012 – Olympic Games

References
 Profile on New Zealand Hockey

External links
 

1981 births
Living people
New Zealand male field hockey players
Male field hockey defenders
Olympic field hockey players of New Zealand
2002 Men's Hockey World Cup players
Field hockey players at the 2004 Summer Olympics
2006 Men's Hockey World Cup players
Field hockey players at the 2008 Summer Olympics
2010 Men's Hockey World Cup players
Field hockey players at the 2012 Summer Olympics
2014 Men's Hockey World Cup players
Commonwealth Games medallists in field hockey
Commonwealth Games silver medallists for New Zealand
Commonwealth Games bronze medallists for New Zealand
Field hockey players at the 2002 Commonwealth Games
Field hockey players at the 2006 Commonwealth Games
Field hockey players at the 2010 Commonwealth Games
Field hockey players from Christchurch
SV Kampong players
Expatriate field hockey players
New Zealand expatriate sportspeople in the Netherlands
Hockey India League players
Delhi Waveriders players
20th-century New Zealand people
21st-century New Zealand people
Medallists at the 2002 Commonwealth Games
Medallists at the 2010 Commonwealth Games